Sirohi District is a district of Rajasthan state in western India. The city of Sirohi is the district headquarters.

As of 2011 it is the third least populous district of Rajasthan (out of 33), after Jaisalmer and Pratapgarh.

History
In 1948, Sirohi was taken over by Bombay State from 5 January 1949 to 25 January 1950. Shortly thereafter, on 25 January 1950, the former state was partitioned with Abu Road tehsil and part of Delwara tehsil being joined to Bombay and the remaining portion merging with Rajasthan. At that time an area of 787 km2 consisting of Abu Road tehsil and a part of Delwara tehsil was merged with then Bombay state, but it was returned to Sirohi district of Rajasthan State on 1 November 1956.

Sirohi is also called as "Dev Nagari" since ancient times because of many temples and shrines in the district. Sirohi is also famous for manufacturing of double edged swords, from the time of the Chauhan Deora rulers (15th century AD) until 1947.

Geography
The district has an area of 5136 km². It is bordered on the west by Jalor District, on the north by Pali District, on the east by Udaipur District, and on the south by Banas Kantha District of Gujarat.

It has an area of 5139 km (2009 sq. miles). Sirohi district is situated at the south-west part of Rajasthan between parallel of 24° 20′ and 25° 17′ North Latitude and 72° 16′ and 73° 10′ East Longitude.

Sirohi District is broken up by hills and rocky ranges. The granite massif of Mount Abu divides the district into two portions, running from north-east to south-west. The south and south-east part of the district, which lies between Mount Abu and the main spine of the Aravallis, is mountainous and rugged, and is drained by the West Banas River. Abu Road, a station on the main Delhi-Ahmedabad rail line, lies in the valley of the West Banas. Dry deciduous forest is common in this part of the district, and the higher elevations of Mount Abu are covered in conifer forests. Abu Road is the biggest city and the main financial hub of Sirohi District. Sirohi district has the fewest villages in Rajasthan.

The portion of the district west and north of Mount Abu is drier, lying in the rain shadow of the mountain, which blocks the southwest monsoon. The southwest corner of the district is drained by the Sukri river, an intermittent stream that drains the western slope of Mount Abu. The northwestern portion of the district is drained by tributaries of the Luni River. The Northwestern thorn scrub forests cover the western and northern portion of the district. Warada is the last village of Sirohi located on Sirohi–Siyana Road.

Demographics

According to the 2011 census Sirohi district has a population of 1,036,346, roughly equal to the nation of Cyprus or the US state of Rhode Island. This gives it a ranking of 437rd in India (out of a total of 640). Its population growth rate over the decade 2001-2011 was 21.86%. Sirohi has a sex ratio of  938 females for every 1000 males, and a literacy rate of 56.02%. 20.13% of the population live in urban areas. Scheduled Castes and Scheduled Tribes make up 19.48% and 28.22% of the population respectively.

Languages 

At the time of the 2011 census, 76.47% of the population spoke Marwari, 7.54% Hindi, 7.04% Rajasthani and 6.44% Garasia as their first language.

Economy
In 2006 the Ministry of Panchayati Raj named Sirohi one of the country's 250 most backward districts (out of a total of 640). It is one of the twelve districts in Rajasthan currently receiving funds from the Backward Regions Grant Fund Programme (BRGF).

Administrative setup

There are 5 Sub Divisions in the Sirohi district: Sirohi, Mount Abu, Sheoganj, Pindwara and Reodar, while five tehsils as well as Panchayat Samitis are Sirohi, Sheoganj, Pindwara, Abu Road and Reodar. Total 162 Gram Panchayts are there for 518 villages in the district and five Nagar Palikas (Municipalitys) are there for Sirohi, Sheoganj, Pindwara, Abu Road and Mount Abu. There are three sub-tehsils- Bhavri in Pindwara, Kalandri in Sirohi and Mandar in Reodar tehsils respectively.

Places of interest 

 Mount Abu	
 Sirohi
 Mirpur Jain Temple (18 km from Sirohi City)
 Mungathala
 Shree Pavapuri Tirth Dham
 Jirawala
 Chandravati Temple, 6 km from Abu Road city (a historical temple)
 Kusuma

References

External links

 
 

 
Districts of Rajasthan
Districts in Jodhpur division